Blonder may refer to:

 Blonde and Blonder
 Blonder and Blonder
 Blonder Tongue Audio Baton
 Daryl Blonder (born 1981), actor
 Roger Blonder (born 1967), animator
 Blonder, a Hungarian microbrewery

See also

 Blond